The Washington State Department of Commerce is a state agency in Washington. Based in the state's capitol, Olympia, Washington, the agency is responsible for community and economic development. The agency manages several boards and commissions with a focus on businesses, local governments, tribes, and community-based organizations.

The current director of the department is Lisa Brown, a former majority leader of the Washington State Senate.

References 

State agencies of Washington (state)
State departments of commerce of the United States